Paraliostola is a genus of beetles in the family Cerambycidae, containing the following species:

 Paraliostola durantoni Tavakilian & Monné, 1991
 Paraliostola nigramacula Martins & Galileo, 2010

References

Hesperophanini